Whitegate railway station was the only intermediate station on the Winsford and Over Branch Line, serving the village of Whitegate, Cheshire. The station buildings and platform survive and are used as a visitor centre for the "Whitegate Way", a linear park using the old track bed.

References

Further reading

External links
 Whitegate station on Subterranea Britannica Disused Stations website
Whitegate Way

Disused railway stations in Cheshire
Railway stations in Great Britain opened in 1870
Railway stations in Great Britain closed in 1963
Former Cheshire Lines Committee stations
1870 establishments in England
1963 disestablishments in England
Rail trails in England